Paul Courant (born 1 November 1949) is a Belgian footballer. He played in six matches for the Belgium national football team from 1976 to 1978.

Honours
Individual

 Man of the Season (Belgian First Division): 1975–76

References

External links
 

1949 births
Living people
Belgian footballers
Belgium international footballers
Club Brugge KV players
People from Kortenaken
Association football midfielders
RFC Liège players
Cercle Brugge K.S.V. players
Royale Union Saint-Gilloise players